Vishvanath Temple may refer to any of the following temples dedicated to the Hindu god Shiva, who is also known as Viśvanātha:

 Kashi Vishwanath Temple, Varanasi, Uttar Pradesh
 New Vishwanath Temple, Banaras Hindu University, Varanasi, Uttar Pradesh
 Visvanath Siva Temple, Bhubaneswar, Odisha, India
 Vishvanatha Temple, Khajuraho, Madhya Pradesh, India